Ernest Jury (19 April 1872 – 6 June 1966), also known as Nipper Jury, was a New Zealand lawn bowls player who won a gold medal in the men's fours at the 1938 British Empire Games. He also won two national lawn bowls titles.

Biography
Born on 19 April 1872, Jury was the son of Eliza and Richard Jury. In 1902, he married Jane McClymont, and the couple had two children.

Jury won two New Zealand national bowls championship titles, as skip of the Karangahake Bowling Club team, in the men's fours in 1919 and 1921. He was the first player to skip a four to two titles at the national championships. Not long after, he moved to Auckland, and played for the Ponsonby Bowling Club.

At the 1938 British Empire Games in Sydney, Jury was part of the men's fours team that won the gold medal, along with Bill Bremner, Alec Robertson and Bill Whittaker.

Jury died on 6 June 1966, and was buried at Maunu Cemetery, Whangārei. He was predeceased by his wife, Jane, in 1944.

References

1966 deaths
1872 births
New Zealand male bowls players
Commonwealth Games gold medallists for New Zealand
Bowls players at the 1938 British Empire Games
Commonwealth Games medallists in lawn bowls
Burials at Maunu Cemetery
People from Taranaki
Medallists at the 1938 British Empire Games